Perleidiformes are an extinct order of prehistoric ray-finned fish from the Triassic period Although numerous Triassic taxa have been referred to Perleidiformes, which ones should be included for it to form a monophyletic group is a matter of ongoing scientific debate.

Classification
 Family †Cleithrolepididae Wade 1935 corrig. [Cleithrolepidae Wade 1935; Hydropessidae Hutchinson 1973]
 Genus †Hydropessum Broom 1909
 Genus †Cleithrolepidina Berg 1955
 Genus †Cleithrolepis Egerton 1864
 Genus †Dipteronotus Egerton 1864
 Suborder †Cephaloxenoidei Lehman 1966 
 Family †Cephaloxenidae Brough 1939
 Genus †Cephaloxenus Brough 1939
 Suborder †Perleidoidei
 Family †Platysiagidae Brough 1939 sensu Neuman & Mutter 2005
 Genus †Caelatichthys Lombardo 2002
 Genus †Helmolepis Stensiö 1932
 Genus †Platysiagum Egerton 1872
 Family †Polzbergiidae Griffin 1977
 Genus †Luopingichthys Sun et al. 2009
 Genus †Serrolepis Quenstedt 1852 ex Dames 1888
 Genus †Ctenognathichthys Burgin 1992
 Genus †Stoppania Lombardo, Rusconi & Tintori 2008
 Genus †Polzbergia Griffith 1977
 Genus †Felberia Lombardo & Tintori 2004
 Family †Gabanellidae Tintori & Lombardo 1996
 Genus †Gabanellia Tintori & Lombardo 1996
 Family †Aetheodontidae Brough 1939
 Genus †Aetheodontus Brough 1939
 Family †Colobodontidae Andersson 1916 [Asterodontidae Jordan 1923]
 Genus †Albertonia Gardiner 1966
 Genus †Boreichthys Selezneva 1982
 Genus †Cenchrodus von Meyer 1847
 Genus †Chrotichthys Wade 1940
 Genus †Crenilepis Dames 1888 [Crenilepoides Strand 1929]
 Genus †Dollopterus Abel 1906 [Dolichopterus Compter 1891 non Hall 1859 non Murray 1870]
 Genus †Engycolobodus Oertle 1927
 Genus †Hemilopas von Meyer 1847
 Genus †Manlietta Wade 1935
 Genus †Meidiichthys Borough 1931
 Genus †Meridensia Stensiö 1916
 Genus †Nephrotus Meyer 1849 [Omphalodus Meyer 1847; Eupleurodus Gürich, 1884]
 Genus †Pristisomus Woodward 1890
 Genus †Procheirichthys Wade 1935
 Genus †Zeuchthiscus Wade 1940
 Genus †Colobodus Agassiz 1844 [Asterodon Münster, 1841] 
 Family †Pseudobeaconiidae López-Arbarello & Zavattieri 2008
 Genus †Caminchaia Rusconi 1946a
 Genus †Echentaia Rusconi 1946
 Genus †Pasambaya Rusconi 1946a
 Genus †Anatoia Rusconi 1946a
 Genus †Pseudobeaconia Bordas 1944
 Family †Perleididae Brough 1931 [Fuyuanperleididae Sun et al. 2012]
 Genus †Altisolepis Mutter & Herzog 2004
 Genus †Alvinia Sytchevskaya 1999 non Monterosato 1884
 Genus †Chaohuperleidus Sun et al., 2013
 Genus †Daninia Lombardo 2001
 Genus †Diandongperleidus Geng et al. 2012
 Genus †Endennia Lombardo & Brambillasca 2005
 Genus †Fuyuanperleidus Geng et al. 2012
 Genus †Luopingperleidus Geng et al. 2012
 Genus †Megaperleidus Sytchevskaya 1999
 Genus †Mendocinichthys Whitley 1953 [Mendocinia Bordas 1944 non Jensen-Haarup 1920]
 Genus †Paraperleidus Zhao & Liu 2007
 Genus †Peltoperleidus Bürgin et al. 1991
 Genus †Plesioperleidus Su & Li 1983 sensu Tong et al. 2006 [Zhangina Liu 2002]
 Genus †Perleidus De Alessandri 1910 sensu Lombardo et al. 2011

Timeline of genera

References

External links

Prehistoric neopterygii
Triassic bony fish
Prehistoric ray-finned fish orders